Michael George Vrabel (born August 14, 1975) is an American football coach and former linebacker who is the head coach of the Tennessee Titans of the National Football League (NFL). He played college football at Ohio State, where he earned consensus All-American honors. Vrabel was drafted by the Pittsburgh Steelers in the third round of the 1997 NFL Draft, then joined the New England Patriots as a free agent in 2001, becoming a three-time Super Bowl champion and an All-Pro during his tenure, then finished his career with the Kansas City Chiefs.

After retiring as a player following the 2010 season, Vrabel was the linebackers and defensive line coach at Ohio State for three seasons. His NFL coaching career began in 2014 with the Houston Texans as linebackers coach and then defensive coordinator, before becoming the Titans' head coach in 2018.

Early years
Vrabel was born in Akron, Ohio. He is a 1993 graduate of Walsh Jesuit High School in nearby Cuyahoga Falls, where he was a standout on their football team coached by Andrew Slome.

Playing career

College
Vrabel accepted an athletic scholarship to attend Ohio State University and played defensive end from 1993 to 1996. He compiled twelve quarterback sacks as a sophomore, thirteen as a junior, and forty-eight tackles and nine sacks as a senior. As a senior in 1996, he was recognized as a consensus first-team All-American. Vrabel finished his career at Ohio State by being named the Big Ten Defensive Lineman of the Year in both 1995 and 1996, becoming the first of two players to ever win the award twice (Wendell Bryant of Wisconsin being the other). He accumulated 36 sacks and 66 tackles for a loss.

He was named to the Ohio State Football All-Century Team in 2000, and in 2012 was inducted into the Ohio State Athletics Hall of Fame.

National Football League

Pittsburgh Steelers
Vrabel was drafted by the Pittsburgh Steelers in the third round (91st overall) of the 1997 NFL Draft. He spent the first four seasons of his career in Pittsburgh. His most notable play as a Steeler came in his rookie season, when he sacked Drew Bledsoe in the 1997–98 AFC Divisional Playoffs to clinch a 7–6 win for the Steelers. Vrabel had 12 tackles and 2.5 sacks in 1998; 9 tackles and two sacks in 1999; and 15 tackles, one sack, and one fumble recovery in 2000.

New England Patriots

Vrabel joined the New England Patriots as a free agent for the 2001 season. He played in every game on defense, starting in 12. He would occasionally come in as an eligible receiver, lining up as a tight end. Bill Belichick took advantage of this in 2004 in Super Bowl XXXVIII. In the fourth quarter, Tom Brady threw a 1-yard touchdown pass to Vrabel, making Vrabel the first defensive player to score a Super Bowl touchdown on offense since William "Refrigerator" Perry did so for the Chicago Bears against the Patriots in 1986's Super Bowl XX. Vrabel was one of the defensive stars as well; he had two sacks (one forcing a fumble) of Carolina Panthers quarterback Jake Delhomme.

In Super Bowl XXXIX in 2005, Vrabel caught a two-yard touchdown pass despite being held by the Eagles' Jevon Kearse, a feat pictured on the cover of the 2005 NFL Record and Fact Book. The reception made him one of 17 players to catch two or more touchdown passes in Super Bowls.

Vrabel finished with ten career receptions in just 14 targets, all for touchdowns.  He caught one in 2002, two in 2004, three in 2005, and two in 2007 in the regular season, and one each in Super Bowls XXXVIII and XXXIX, all with the Patriots, and one each in 2009 and 2010 with the Chiefs (thrown by former Patriot Matt Cassel). According to the website Cold Hard Football Facts, no other player in NFL history has a better record of converting receptions to touchdowns. His versatility was good enough for NFL Network to rank him #7 on their Top 10 episode of the Most Versatile Players.

In Week 8 of the 2007 season, Vrabel forced three fumbles, had three sacks, recovered an onside kick, and scored an offensive touchdown against the Washington Redskins, for which he was named the AFC Defensive Player of the Week. In December 2007, he was selected to start at the Pro Bowl; in January 2008, he was named to the NFL All-Pro team for the 2007 season.

On December 26, 2005, on the final Monday Night Football game on ABC, Vrabel became, according to the Elias Sports Bureau, the first player—since the official recording of sacks began in 1982—to have two touchdown catches and a sack in the same game.

Though right outside linebacker had been Vrabel's primary position in the Patriots' 3–4 scheme in his first four seasons with New England, in 2005 Vrabel moved to inside linebacker, because of the limited effectiveness of inside backers Monty Beisel and Chad Brown, although he had never before played inside in the NFL. By the time Tedy Bruschi returned from injury, he and Vrabel were the two men starting inside. Rosevelt Colvin successfully filled Vrabel's old spot, and many cite the change in positions as a major contributor to the Patriots' rebound in the second half of the season. Vrabel moved inside again late in the 2006 season after Junior Seau suffered a broken arm.

Kansas City Chiefs
On February 27, 2009, the Patriots traded Vrabel to the Kansas City Chiefs for what was originally announced as an undisclosed draft pick. The next day it was revealed that Patriots traded both Vrabel and Matt Cassel in exchange for the Chiefs' second round pick, the 34th overall selection in the 2009 NFL Draft.

NFL career statistics

Regular season

Postseason

Coaching career

Ohio State
Vrabel retired on July 10, 2011 to become the linebackers coach at Ohio State. On December 21, 2011 new Ohio State head coach Urban Meyer decided to keep Vrabel on as part of his coaching staff as defensive line coach.

Houston Texans
On January 10, 2014, Vrabel was hired by the Houston Texans as a linebackers coach. During his three seasons as linebackers coach, the Texans ranked third in the NFL in yards allowed per game. In January 2016 news outlets reported that the San Francisco 49ers offered Vrabel their defensive coordinator job; Vrabel declined the offer and remained in Houston. In January 2017, the Texans named Vrabel as their defensive coordinator, moving previous coordinator Romeo Crennel to assistant head coach. He coached players such as J. J. Watt, Jadeveon Clowney, Whitney Mercilus and Benardrick McKinney.

Tennessee Titans

On January 20, 2018, Vrabel was hired as the head coach of the Tennessee Titans on a five-year deal. On September 16, 2018, Vrabel beat the Houston Texans 20–17 in Week 2 for his first career win as a head coach. On September 30, 2018, he led the Titans to a 26–23 overtime victory over the defending champion Philadelphia Eagles in a Week 4 upset. On November 11, 2018, Vrabel beat his former longtime coach Bill Belichick and the New England Patriots in a 34–10 Week 10 victory. Under Vrabel, the Titans' defense improved from the 13th-ranked defense in 2017 to the eighth-ranked defense in 2018. Vrabel and the Titans narrowly missed the playoffs by one game and finished the 2018 season with a 9–7 record.

The 2019 season saw the Titans once again finish 9–7; however, this would be enough to make the playoffs as a sixth seed. During a 16–0 shutout loss to the Denver Broncos in Week 6, Vrabel elected to bench quarterback Marcus Mariota in favor of Ryan Tannehill, a move that led to the Titans winning seven of their final ten games despite starting 2–4.

In the Wild Card Round, Tennessee upset the defending Super Bowl champion New England Patriots 20–13, led by running back Derrick Henry's 204 yards from scrimmage, to advance to the Divisional Round. The Titans pulled off another upset against the top-seeded Baltimore Ravens, winning 28–12 behind another breakout performance from Henry with 202 scrimmage yards along with a passing touchdown on a trick play. With the victory, the Titans advanced to their first AFC Championship in seventeen seasons, where they were eliminated by the eventual Super Bowl LIV champion Kansas City Chiefs 35–24. For his work in the 2021-22 NFL season, he was named the AP Coach of the Year.

Head coaching record

Personal life
Vrabel and his wife, Jennifer, have two sons, Tyler and Carter. Tyler started on the offensive line for the Boston College Eagles football team for 3 years and declared himself for the 2022 NFL Draft.  Undrafted, Tyler was signed by the Atlanta Falcons in the 2022 preseason. In September 2019 Carter committed to play baseball at Wabash Valley College. Vrabel founded the "Mike's Second and Seven Foundation" with his former Ohio State teammates Ryan Miller and Luke Fickell to promote literacy in the Ohio area.

In March 2011, Vrabel was arrested and charged with a Class D felony for theft at an Indiana casino. According to reports from Kansas City television station KMBC and ProFootballTalk.com, the incident involved eight bottles of beer at a deli. Vrabel was released after posting a $600 bond.

References

External links

Tennessee Titans bio

1975 births
Living people
All-American college football players
American Conference Pro Bowl players
American football outside linebackers
Kansas City Chiefs players
New England Patriots players
Ohio State Buckeyes football coaches
Ohio State Buckeyes football players
Pittsburgh Steelers players
Players of American football from Akron, Ohio
Houston Texans coaches
National Football League defensive coordinators
Tennessee Titans head coaches
Coaches of American football from Ohio
American people of Czech descent
Ed Block Courage Award recipients